A village is a sub-type of municipalities in the Canadian province of Ontario. A village can have the municipal status of either a single-tier or lower-tier municipality.

Ontario has 11 villages that had a cumulative population of 13,695 and an average population of 1,245 in the 2016 Census. Ontario's largest and smallest villages are Casselman and Thornloe with populations of 3,548 and 112 respectively.

History 
Under the former Municipal Act, 1990, a village was both an urban and a local municipality. Under this former legislation, a locality with a population of 500 or more could have been incorporated as a village by Ontario's Municipal Board upon review of an application from 75 or more residents of the locality.

In the transition to the Municipal Act, 2001, the above designations and requirements were abandoned and, as at December 31, 2002, every village that:
"existed and formed part of a county, a regional or district municipality or the County of Oxford for municipal purposes" became a lower-tier municipality yet retained its name as a village; and
"existed and did not form part of a county, a regional or district municipality or the County of Oxford for municipal purposes" became a single-tier municipality yet retained its name as a village.
The current legislation also provides lower and single-tier municipalities with the authority to name themselves as "villages", or other former municipal status types such as "cities", "towns" or "townships", or generically as "municipalities".

Villages in Ontario

See also 
List of cities in Ontario
List of communities in Ontario
List of municipalities in Ontario
List of towns in Ontario
List of township municipalities in Ontario

References 

Villages